White Horse Tavern is a historic inn and tavern located in East Fallowfield Township, Chester County, Pennsylvania. It was built in 1816, and is a two-story, five bay, stuccoed stone building with a gable roof in the Federal style. It features a formal pedimented entrance. The tavern was built for Robert Young, who also built the Robert Young House located across the intersection.

It was added to the National Register of Historic Places in 1985.

References

Hotel buildings on the National Register of Historic Places in Pennsylvania
Federal architecture in Pennsylvania
Commercial buildings completed in 1816
Buildings and structures in Chester County, Pennsylvania
1816 establishments in Pennsylvania
National Register of Historic Places in Chester County, Pennsylvania